The Saints' Way is a long-distance footpath in mid Cornwall, England, UK.

History and description
The footpath runs from Padstow  parish church in the north via Luxulyan to Fowey parish church   in the south, a distance of 28.5 miles (45.6 km); if the route via Lanlivery is followed the distance is 29 miles (46.6 km). The path is well marked and guide books are available. There are two main branches in the way. One starts at Fowey, runs west to Tywardreath, then north through St Blazey, and Luxulyan. The other runs north from Fowey to Golant and Lanlivery. The branches meet close to Helman Tor. Part of the route is a bridleway so can be used by horse-riders.

The Saints' Way follows a possible route of early Christian travellers making their way from Ireland to the Continent. Rather than risk the difficult passage around Land's End they could disembark from ships on the North Cornish coast and progress to ports such as Fowey on foot. 

Between 55 - 50AD a Roman trading centre was constructed at Nanstallon (near Bodmin) and it is thought its purpose was to serve the main communication and trade route linking the north Cornish coast at the River Camel and the southern coast at the River Fowey, the 'transpeninsular route'.  However the centre was abandoned after only 20-25 years and it was never used again. It is thought that the trading route served the Celtic peoples of Ireland, Wales, Cornwall and Brittany as Nanstallon was built close to major mineral bearing areas.

The establishment of the way followed the discovery of a section of abandoned pathway surfaced with cobbles and featuring a series of granite stiles near the village of Luxulyan by two villagers (Cliff Townes and Alf Fookes) in 1984, but Luxulyan has a long history of producing high-quality granite, and cobbles are common on nearby Red Moor so the use of both materials is not necessarily significant, and stiles made of granite are traditional in the area. The way was created as part of the Cooperative Retail Services Community Programme and opened in 1986.

References

External links

 Saints' Way information at Cornwall County Council

Footpaths in Cornwall
Long-distance footpaths in England